Lei Yue Mun is a short channel in Hong Kong. It lies between Junk Bay and Victoria Harbour, separating Kowloon and Hong Kong Island. The channel is an important passage for the city, forming the eastern entrance of Victoria Harbour.

The lands around the channel are also called Lei Yue Mun. On Kowloon side, it is famous for its seafood market and restaurants in the fishing villages. On the Hong Kong Island side, it has former military defence facilities.

Names
The Chinese name for the channel means "Carp Gate" and is pronounced Lei5 yu4 mun4 in Cantonese. It has been variously transcribed and translated over the years, appearing as the Ly-ce-moon Pass, the Ly-ee-moon Pass, Ly-e-Mun Pass, Lyemun, Lymoon, and the Lye Moon Passage.

Places and facilities
On Hong Kong Island
Lei Yue Mun Fort, converted into the Hong Kong Museum of Coastal Defence
Lyemun Barracks, converted into the Lei Yue Mun Park and Holiday Village

On Kowloon
 Lei Yue Mun Village:
 Ma Pui Tsuen
 Ma San Tsuen
 Ma Wan Tsuen
 Sam Ka Tsuen
 Sam Ka Tsuen Typhoon Shelter
 Tin Hau temple, a Grade II historic building in Ma Wan Tsuen. The temple was built in 1753 and completely reconstructed in 1953. A Hip Tin Temple adjacent to the Tin Hau Temple was added after 1953 for the worship of Kwan Tai.
 Old Quarry Site Structures, listed as Grade III historic buildings.
 Lighthouse
 Wish Tree
 Lei Yue Mun Municipal Services Building
 Lei Yue Mun Estate, a public housing estate in Yau Tong
 Domain and Lei Yue Mun Plaza, shopping malls

Transportation
 Ferry: Coral Sea Shipping Services provides a regular service between Sam Ka Tsuen pier and Sai Wan Ho pier. Fare is HK$9 per adult.
 Bus: Kowloon Motor Bus operates circular bus route no. 14X between Sam Ka Tsuen and Tsim Sha Tsui 
 Minibus: Red minibus service is available between Kwun Tong and Lei Yue Mun, and between Mong Kok and Lei Yue Mun.
 MTR: Yau Tong station (Kowloon side)

Education
Lei Yue Mun is in Primary One Admission (POA) School Net 48. Within the school net are multiple aided schools (operated independently but funded with government money) and Kwun Tong Government Primary School.

See also
 Devil's Peak, Hong Kong
 Lei Yue Mun Road
 Four hills of Kowloon

References

External links

 Harbourfront Enhancement Committee "Revitalizing Lei Yue Mun", October 2009
 Tourism Commission website: "Lei Yue Mun Waterfront Enhancement Project"
 Antiquities Advisory Board. Historic Building Appraisal. Old Quarry Site Structures, Lei Yue Mun, Kwun Tong, Kowloon Pictures

Channels of Hong Kong
Victoria Harbour
Places in Hong Kong
World War II sites in Hong Kong
New Kowloon